"Armor Wars" is a seven-issue Iron Man story arc written by David Michelinie and Bob Layton with art by Mark D. Bright and Barry Windsor-Smith and published by Marvel Comics. The arc first appears in Iron Man #225–232.

Publication history
While "Armor Wars" is the popular name for the storyline and is the name used for the trade paperback collection, the actual story is referred to as "Stark Wars" within the issues themselves.  The source of the name "Armor Wars" stems from the fact that the storyline was advertised in other Marvel titles with full page ads reading: "TIME FOR THE AVENGER TO START AVENGING.  THE ARMOR WAR BEGINS IN IRON MAN #225." The storyline ran through Iron Man (Vol. 1) #225 (December 1987) to #231 (June 1988), plotted by David Michelinie and Bob Layton with art by Mark Bright, though much of the groundwork for the story itself occurred during Iron Man #219-224. Iron Man encounters the Spymaster, who steals the Stark technology. Iron Man also encounters Force, which sets up the plot of "Armor Wars" in the following issues.

An epilogue to the storyline was published in Iron Man (Vol. 1) #232 (July 1988), co-plotted by Michelinie and Barry Windsor-Smith with art by Windsor-Smith.

"Armor Wars II" followed in issues Iron Man (Vol. 1) #258 (July 1990) to #266 (March 1991).

Plot

Part One: Stark Wars
After Iron Man finishes a training session in order to impress a general, he returns to Stark Enterprises. Upon analyzing Force's armor, Tony discovers that the armor is based in part on his own designs which were stolen before his current Iron Man armor was developed. He compiles a list of several armored criminals: Beetle, Shockwave, Doctor Doom, Stilt-Man, the Crimson Dynamo, Controller, Mauler, Professor Power, Titanium Man, the Raiders, and others. Distraught about the damage his technology might inflict, Iron Man teams up with Scott Lang to find out who stole his designs. Tony uncovers that the Spymaster was the one who sold Tony's designs to his rival Justin Hammer. Iron Man goes after the Stilt-Man, who is attempting to break into a high-rise office building, and renders the armor inoperable with a negator pack which destroys Stark circuitry. A short time later, Iron Man gets Mauler to surrender his battlesuit without a fight, and then defeats the Controller and negates his armor. Unable to pursue legal means to reclaim his technology, Tony plans to take out every armored warrior who is suspected of having his designs.

Part Two: Glitch
Iron Man intercepts and negates the Raiders, and later finds out one name is missing from Hammer's database due to a glitch in the upload. Tony and Jim Rhodes run a search of other armor-using individuals, which prompts Tony to identify the government-sponsored Stingray as the best candidate, as other known armored heroes and villains are either not advanced enough or would not use others' designs. Tony's actions draw the West Coast Avengers' attention, but he declines the Avengers' offer of assistance, saying that his problems are personal. Iron Man travels to the Hydro-Base, where he confronts Stingray and insists that he be allowed to test his armor for stolen circuitry. When Stingray refuses, Iron Man chases him throughout the ocean and incapacitates him. He then unsuccessfully attempts to negate Stingray's armor; Stingray's armor really was not based on Stark's designs. Due to this incident, Tony is informed that the government wants Iron Man to be shut down. Reluctantly, Tony announces that Iron Man's contract has been terminated.

Part Three: The Last Mandroid
Iron Man ruthlessly attacks the Beetle as he tries to steal exotic pieces of art. Beetle attempts to escape Iron Man's wrath, but is defeated and his armor negated. Iron Man returns to his base, where he has a talk with Hawkeye. Nick Fury of S.H.I.E.L.D. meets with Tony and demands that Iron Man be handed over to him for attacking Stingray. Tony gives Fury Iron Man's file, having prepared a fake identity for Iron Man as 'Randall Pierce' in the event of such a scenario. Tony secretly intends to destroy S.H.I.E.L.D.'s Mandroid armors - which he also designed - to prevent their technology being replicated. He tells Fury that 'Pierce' has set up a hidden base in New York and suggests Fury dispatch the Mandroids to bring Iron Man in. Tony, as Iron Man, engages the Mandroids and disables all five, much to Fury's dismay. Tony fakes evidence to suggest that Iron Man knew about their plan because he planted a bug in their equipment. Later, Tony arranges to create a new shield for Captain America.

(Note: The "Nick Fury vs S.H.I.E.L.D." mini-series hinted the "Fury" in this story was a Life Model Decoy, the real Fury claiming to have no idea of these events).

Part Four: Who Guards the Guardsmen?
The Captain (an alias used by Steve Rogers at that time) thanks Tony for the new shield, but after having learned of Tony's crusade, he tries to dissuade him from continuing.  Meanwhile, Rhodes, disguised as the villain Electro, lets himself captured by the Guardsmen to infiltrate the Vault. Iron Man sneaks into the prison to neutralize the Guardsmen, but is followed by the Captain and engaged by several Guardsmen. Rhodes accidentally breaks out all the prisoners at the Vault after he tricks a Guardsman who ambushed him. While the Captain tries to save a Guardsman from dying, Iron Man temporarily paralyzes him, but the reproachful look Rogers gives him in turn gnaws at his conscience.

Part Five: Red Snow
The West Coast Avengers arrives at Tony's home, where they try to make Tony stand down, which he refuses. In the Soviet Union, Crimson Dynamo and Gremlin (as the Titanium Man) meet with the KGB, who tell them of Iron Man's crusade and that he will soon come for them as well. Gremlin refuses to heed the warning and departs for his hidden base Bitterfrost, thereby unintentionally making himself a bait for Iron Man. Tony constructs a modified version of the Stealth armor to sneak into Russia undetected and go after Titanium Man. The KGB sends the Crimson Dynamo in to take out Iron Man and the Gremlin, distracting Iron Man and giving the Gremlin time to enter his Titanium Man armor. Iron Man defeats and negates the Crimson Dynamo, but is overwhelmed and grabbed by Titanium Man. Iron Man flies up to space to try to shake him off, but his boot jets ignite Titanium Man's armor, which combusts, killing the Gremlin. Back at the West Coast Avengers Mansion, Iron Man is stripped of his Avengers membership.

Part Six: The Day the Hero Died
Edwin Cord, Tony's rival, demonstrates his Firepower armor, piloted by Jack Taggert, to his sponsors Senator Boynton and US Army General Maede regarding the US Government's plan to neutralize rogue superheroes, starting with Iron Man. After safeguarding his technology from later thefts by introducing a "tapeworm" virus into the worldwide computer network, Tony discovers that Firepower is the missing name from Hammer's list. Later, Maede asks Tony to help lay a trap utilizing Firepower against Iron Man, and Tony decides to spring it in order to eliminate this final security risk. But as he encounters Firepower, he finds himself heavily outgunned and barely escapes with the help of Rhodes. But when the military prepares to continue the attack, thereby putting Rhodes' life at risk, Tony sends out the empty Iron Man armor by remote control. Firepower launches a nuclear missile at Iron Man, seemingly killing him.

Part Seven: Reborn Again
With Iron Man officially declared dead, Tony refuses to construct new armor, deciding to let his Iron Man identity rest. Elsewhere, Boynton and Maede try to make Cord hand over Firepower, but Cord blackmails them by threatening to leak their plans about using Firepower as a means of crowd control to the public, should they try any form of legal action against him. Firepower then disrupts Stark Enterprises' commercial operations and reveals to Tony that Cord wants revenge on both Tony and Iron Man for destroying Cord Conglomerate. Determined, Tony invents another version of the Iron Man armor to combat Firepower. Days later, Firepower attacks Stark Enterprises' San Francisco bureau, only to face off against the "new" Iron Man. After a lengthy battle, Iron Man defeats Firepower, and an attempted taunt by Taggert makes him reconsider continuing as Iron Man.

Epilogue: Intimate Enemies
Tony battles the Iron Man armor in a nightmare and has to come to terms with the innocent victims his company created and his struggle with alcoholism.

Collected editions
The storyline was collected in a trade paperback in 1990. The book quickly fell out of print and would not be re-released until 2007, when Marvel released a new printing (with a new cover). The book collects issues #225-#231 as well as the epilogue to the story presented in issue #232.

The Prologue story (#215-224) was published in a trade paperback in March 2010. A collection of the sequel story, Armor Wars II (#258-266), was released in May 2010.

Other versions

What If?
There was an issue called "What If Iron Man Lost the Armor Wars" in which Justin Hammer still manages to obtain Stark Technology. Scott Lang ends up passing out from the knock-out gas when gathering info on who has the stolen technology and ends up captured by Justin Hammer's men. When Tony Stark dons his Iron Man armor, Justin Hammer takes control of it and manipulated the Iron Man armor to reveal his identity and place a mind-control collar on him when it turns out that Scott Lang and his daughter Cassandra are his hostages. Justin Hammer then makes Tony Stark destroy Stark Enterprise, with James Rhodes now in a coma, and reveal his identity to the press. Afterwards, Tony Stark shaved his mustache and dyed his hair yellow after discarding the armor and the collar. When A.I.M. steals the technology from Justin Hammer, they start targeting the armored warriors and one of their attacks kill two of the Raiders. Tony meets up with Controller, Mauler, Stilt-Man, Beetle, Titanium Man, Crimson Dynamo, and the surviving Raider to infiltrate the A.I.M. Omega Branch where Tony takes control of the Firepower armor to defeat A.I.M. When he suggests to the armored villains to turn themselves in, they attack Tony Stark only to be stopped by Captain America, Wonder Man, and Hank Pym. Hawkeye tells Tony that they would have to take him to jail for his actions. Rather than attack the heroes, Tony Stark decides to take his chances in court for he knows that if he did attack, Justin Hammer would have won.

Breaking Into Comics the Marvel Way
The first issue of the two-part new-artist-introduction series Breaking Into Comics the Marvel Way offers a final epilogue to the story. In the immediate aftermath of the Armor Wars, Tony Stark makes a video recording of his last will and testament. In his will, Tony explains his desire to see humanity changed for the better by advanced technology, but also expresses his horror and sense of guilt for the past misuse of technology that he created. Unwilling to allow for the possibility that his inventions might continue to be abused after he dies, Tony reveals that his death will automatically trigger 'Project Icarus': a computer program that will seize control of every Iron Man suit Tony has ever created, as well as every machine on Earth containing any Stark-developed technology, and set them all on a collision course with the sun.

Iron Man and the Armor Wars
A 4-issue mini-series titled Iron Man & The Armor Wars, a modernization of the Armor Wars concept for a new audience, debuted in August 2009, written by Joe Caramagna with art by Craig Rousseau. A hardcover collection of the story was published in February 2010 (ISN 978-0-7851-4448-9).

Ultimate Marvel

A four-issue mini-series titled Ultimate Comics: Armor Wars began in September 2009. It is written by Warren Ellis. It takes place after Ultimatum where Iron Man tries to find his remaining armors and save his enterprise.

Secret Wars (2015)
A new Armor Wars mini-series appears as part of the 2015 Secret Wars storyline. The Battleworld domain associated with this mini-series is called Technopolis where its inhabitants are forced to wear Iron Man armors due to a disease and will have that area's Tony Stark and Arno Stark as rival manufacturers.

In the futuristic domain of Technopolis, War Machine (who is the Thor Corps operative of Technopolis) answers a challenge to fight Titanium Man while suspecting that he's being tested. Titanium Man mocks War Machine's position as the Thor of the Domain of Technopolis, but is easily defeated. Iron Man arrives and the two banter about Tony's political position as Baron before talk turns to War Machine's gut feeling over the reasoning behind the duel. Tony suspects Kingpin, but Jim is unsure. They then discuss vigilantes in Technopolis including Spider-Man and Radar Devil. Iron Man suggests they should be arrested, but informs War Machine that he's off to meet with Spider-Man anyway. Meanwhile, Iron Man's brother Arno Stark meets with Kingpin at Stark Tower and assesses the valuable data compiled by having paid Titanium Man to fight War Machine. Kingpin assures Arno that Titanium Man's silence has been bought and that failsafes are in place. Elsewhere in the city, Spider-Man is late for work as he heads to his planned meeting with Iron Man. He reveals himself to be Peter Urich and plans to tell Tony that he had uncovered the truth about the origin of the disease that forced Technopolis' citizens to wear armor just to survive.

It was revealed that Baron Tony Stark and Arno Stark's father Howard Stark encouraged a friendly rivalry between them to promote affection, but ended up creating a bitter never-ending competition between the two brothers to provide Technopolis with life and mobility. Tony was chosen to become the domain's Baron during Howard's sickness that ultimately took his life. Tony promised Howard to allow Arno free market in the city as long as he didn't break any laws. Even though Arno constantly opposed Tony and even provided technology for criminals, Tony had not been able to prove his brother's illicit activities and opposed the idea to use his power as Baron to get rid of Arno. Also, Stark had tried to acquire Mobairu Yōsai Mechaniks to help Kiri Oshiro (who was the daughter of Rumiko Fujikawa) as well as to protect the company from Arno. Spider-Man was later killed while escaping Kingpin's men.

When Spider-Man's body was found, the autopsy and the analysis of the memory banks in his armor revealed that he had been killed because he had discovered the origin of the disease affecting the residents of the domain. Meanwhile, Arno Stark had sent Stingray to infiltrate the workshop of Kiri Oshiro, the owner of Mobairu Yōsai Mechaniks which is one of the few companies not under Stark's umbrella. Stingray's mission was to discover what technologies was she developing as Stark had recently tried to buy the company. He was defeated by Kiri when he tried to kill her friend Lila Rhodes.

As Grand Marshal James Rhodes informed Kiri Oshiro of the lead on Spider-Man's murderer, Tony Stark confronted Arno Stark for Stingray's attack on Kiri. Some of the information decrypted from the memory banks of Spider-Man's suits made mention of the Kingpin of Crime which was a reason valid enough to make Rhodes pay a visit to Fisk. However, Jim found opposition in the form of Fisk's armored henchmen. Rhodes expected Fisk's opposition and deployed the War Machines from the Hall of Law and Order to assist him.

After being defeated by War Machine, Kingpin made clear at his deathbed that didn't have anything to do with Peter's death. War Machine returned to the Hall of Law and Order to continue investigating the memory banks when he was confronted by Tony Stark. While Arno dealt with the War Machines, Tony revealed to War Machine the link between Technopolis' disease, his father's supposed hand in its creation, and Spider-Man's death. Tony ultimately killed War Machine to prevent the domain from learning the truth. However, War Machine had been able to record and transmit Stark's confession sending it to Kiri. Kiri and War Machine's niece Lila Rhodes unleashed Kiri's secret weapon, a giant suit of armor to stop Tony Stark and Arno Stark once and for all.

As the fight between the Starks and Kira and Lila's giant suits of Armor commences, it's revealed all of Tony Stark's evil machinations. It is revealed that Howard Stark was the creator of the Technopolis Virus and he created it so the city's population would be reliant upon it to survive. The problem was the virus was proven too virulent and hence everyone who caught it instead of the small populace it was intended for became ill including the Starks. As the fight continually rages on. Tony also admits to Kiri why he murdered Spider-Man, Kiri's parents and Peter's father Ben Urich. Tony Stark had implemented a neural inhibitor in the Armor everyone was fitted for and it made the wearer forget if ever they began to question where the virus started from. Kiri's parents who were programmers were able to bypass the inhibitor as was Peter whose Spider-Man armor was capable had to be silenced along with Ben Ulrich who was a news reporter approached with the truth by Kira's parents. Tony Stark also decides to tell Kiri believing he has the upper hand that he was playing both sides and the Kingpin was in his employ to keep tracks on her and his brother Arno. Like Arno, he also tried to hack into her files but was surprised he could never get past Kiri and Lila program's defenses hence the reason he wanted to purchase her technology. Kiri had already figured out this point and to her advantage while they are engaged in combat she incorporates a virus into the Stark's Armor weakening them. The Thor Corps members King Thor of Earth-14412, Storm of Earth-904, Stormbreaker Ray, and Thor of Earth-1610 arrive to deal with Tony and Arno. They are led away to be sentenced by Doom's law. It is also revealed Lila Rhodes is made a Thor Corps member (as her uncle previous), Happy Hogan is the new Sheriff, and Kiri is named new Baroness of Technopolis where she creates new and safer tech for its citizens leading them into a new age.

In other media

Television
 The "Armor Wars" were adapted as a two-part episode of the Iron Man animated series, with Hawkeye appearing in Captain America's place at the Vault. The Ghost steals the armor designs from Stark Enterprises and gave them to Justin Hammer. After Crimson Dynamo committed suicide while destroying a nuclear power plant, Nick Fury gave Tony Stark the remains of Crimson Dynamo's armor. Upon analyzing it, Stark suspects that other armored individuals might be using his armor designs and tasks his A.I. H.O.M.E.R. with determining which ones. With this information, a paranoid Iron Man uses negator packs on the Controller, the Beetle, Stilt-Man, Blacklash, Blizzard, the Guardsmen, and War Machine. After attacking Stingray and discovering his armor was not based on his designs, Stark was attacked by the Hammer Industries automaton Firepower, though Stark eventually destroyed it and deleted files on his armor designs from Hammer Industries' mainframe.
 The "Armor Wars" was adapted into the second season of the Iron Man: Armored Adventures animated series. In the episode "Ghost in the Machine", the Ghost steals Iron Man's armor specs and discovers the hero's secret identity in the process. He sells the former to Justin Hammer and Obadiah Stane but withholds the latter information in order to blackmail the young Tony Stark when he inherits Stark Industries. Using the specs, Hammer eventually becomes Titanium Man in the episode "Titanium vs. Iron" while Stane creates the Guardsmen - Force, Shockwave, and Firepower - and builds the Iron Monger mech in the episodes "Armor Wars" and "Enter: Iron Monger" respectively. In addition, Doctor Doom, Hawkeye, and Black Widow also attempt to claim Stark's technology in the episodes "The Might of Doom" and "The Hawk and the Spider" respectively, though Iron Man is able to fend off his enemies, delete his stolen specs, and personally see Stane ousted from Stark Industries as of the episode "Heavy Mettle".

Marvel Cinematic Universe
 The 2010 live-action Marvel Cinematic Universe (MCU) film Iron Man 2 borrows elements of the "Armor Wars" story, with Tony's alcoholism from the epilogue, and the fear of Stark's technology being duplicated prompting the U.S. government to attempt to appropriate his armor for their own use. Although Stark claims that his nearest rivals are a decade away from perfecting the technology, Ivan Vanko constructs an Arc reactor as a power source for his own armor. In addition, rival industrialist Justin Hammer seeks to build his own line of tech based on Tony's armor, which Vanko remodels into remote-control weaponized automatons called "Hammerdrones". The following sequel Iron Man 3 also mirrors the "Armor Wars" epilogue, when Tony is awoken in the night by his own suit and later forced to battle all of his various armors.
 In December 2020, an Armor Wars television series was announced as part of the MCU for the streaming service Disney+, with Don Cheadle reprising his role as James Rhodes / War Machine from the MCU films. In September 2022, the series was being redeveloped as a feature film.

Video game
The Invincible Iron Man is loosely based on Armor Wars II.

Notes

References

External links
 Armor Wars at the Marvel Universe
 

Comics by David Michelinie
Marvel Comics adapted into films